For or FOR may refer to:

English language
For, a preposition
For, a complementizer
For, a grammatical conjunction

Science and technology
 Fornax, a constellation
 for loop, a programming language statement
 Frame of reference, in physics
 Field of regard, in optoelectronics
 Forced outage rate, in reliability engineering

Other uses
 Fellowship of Reconciliation, a number of religious nonviolent organizations
 Pinto Martins International Airport (IATA airport code), an airport in Brazil
 Revolutionary Workers Ferment (Fomento Obrero Revolucionario), a small left communist international
 Fast oil recovery, systems to remove an oil spill from a wrecked ship
 Field of Research, a component of the Australian and New Zealand Standard Research Classification
FOR, free on rail, an historic form of international commercial term or Incoterm

See also
 Four (disambiguation)